Graptocorixa is a genus of water boatmen in the family Corixidae. There are about six described species in Graptocorixa.

Species
 Graptocorixa abdominalis (Say, 1832)
 Graptocorixa californica (Hungerford, 1925)
 Graptocorixa gerhardi (Hungerford, 1925)
 Graptocorixa serrulata (Uhler, 1897)
 Graptocorixa uhleri (Hungerford, 1925)
 Graptocorixa uhleroidea Hungerford, 1938

References

Further reading

 
 
 
 
 
 
 

Graptocorixini
Nepomorpha genera